Adrian Burns (born 5 August 1971) is a former Australian rules footballer who played with Essendon and St Kilda in the Australian Football League (AFL).

Burns came to Essendon from Dromana, as the 51st selection of the 1988 VFL Draft. He was a member of the Essendon side which won the 1990 Foster's Cup, kicking two goals in the grand final. He made seven regular season appearances for Essendon that year and also participated in their semi final loss to Collingwood. His collision with Alan Richardson in that game resulting in the Collingwood player breaking his collarbone, which would cost him a spot in their premiership team.

Having not played a single senior game in the 1992 and 1993 seasons, Burns made his way to St Kilda in the 1994 Pre-Season Draft, but would make only four appearances.

References

1971 births
Australian rules footballers from Victoria (Australia)
Essendon Football Club players
St Kilda Football Club players
Living people